Pauline Parmentier was the defending champion, but lost in the semifinals to Tatjana Maria.

Johanna Larsson won the title, defeating Maria in the final, 6–1, 6–4.

Seeds

Draw

Finals

Top half

Bottom half

References
Main Draw

Grand Est Open 88 - Singles